The 2014 Intersport Heilbronn Open was a professional tennis tournament played on hard courts. It was the 27th edition of the tournament which was part of the 2014 ATP Challenger Tour. It took place in Heilbronn, Germany between 20 and 26 January 2014.

Singles main-draw entrants

Seeds

 1 Rankings are as of January 13, 2014.

Other entrants
The following players received wildcards into the singles main draw:
  Andreas Beck
  Robin Kern
  Nils Langer

The following players used protected ranking to get into the singles main draw:
  Gilles Müller

The following players received entry from the qualifying draw:
  Andrea Arnaboldi
  Mirza Bašić
  Jan Mertl
  Grzegorz Panfil

The following players received entry as a lucky loser:
  Martin Fischer

Champions

Singles

 Peter Gojowczyk def.  Igor Sijsling, 6–4, 7–5

Doubles

 Tomasz Bednarek /  Henri Kontinen def.  Ken Skupski /  Neal Skupski, 3–6, 7–6(7–3), [12–10]

External links
Official Website

Intersport Heilbronn Open
Intersport Heilbronn Open
Intersport Heilbronn Open
2010s in Baden-Württemberg